Fickle Hill is a locality in Humboldt County, California. Fickle Hill addresses at lower elevations may be in the city limits of Arcata, while those higher up the mountain are unincorporated, and use the Arcata 95521 zip code.

See also

References

Former settlements in Humboldt County, California